Andrew da Silva Ventura (born 1 July 2001), known as just Andrew, is a Brazilian professional footballer who plays as a goalkeeper for the Primeira Liga club Gil Vicente.

Club career
Andrew joined the youth academy of Botafogo at the age of 9, and in 2018 was moved up to their senior team as reserve goalkeeper. He moved to Maranhão on loan in July 2020, until September 2020. On 21 July 2021, he moved to the Portuguese club Gil Vicente on a free transfer signing a 3-year contract. He made his professional debut with Gil Vicente in a 2–1 Primeira Liga win over Benfica on 2 February 2022.

International career
Andrew was called up to a training camp for the Brazil U18s in July 2019.

Personal life
Andrew is the brother of Andrey, who is also a Brazilian football goalkeeper.

References

External links
 
 

2001 births
Living people
People from Duque de Caxias, Rio de Janeiro
Brazilian footballers
Association football goalkeepers
Botafogo de Futebol e Regatas players
Maranhão Atlético Clube players
Gil Vicente F.C. players
Primeira Liga players
Brazilian expatriate footballers
Brazilian expatriates in Portugal
Expatriate footballers in Portugal
Sportspeople from Rio de Janeiro (state)